A Night's Adventure (German:Abenteuer einer Nacht) is a 1923 German silent thriller film directed by and starring Harry Piel.

The film's sets were designed by the art director Kurt Richter.

Cast
 Harry Piel 
 Lissy Arna
 Friedrich Kühne 
 Fred Immler
 Albert Bassermann

References

Bibliography
 Grange, William. Cultural Chronicle of the Weimar Republic. Scarecrow Press, 2008.

External links

1923 films
Films of the Weimar Republic
Films directed by Harry Piel
German silent feature films
German black-and-white films